This is a list of years in Monaco. For only articles about years in Monaco that have been written, see :Category:Years in Monaco.

13th – 18th century 
1200s ·
1300s ·
1400s ·
1500s ·
1600s ·
1700s

19th century 
Decades: 1800s ·
1810s ·
1820s ·
1830s ·
1840s ·
1850s ·
1860s ·
1870s ·
1880s ·
1890s

20th century 
Decades: 1900s ·
1910s ·
1920s ·
1930s ·
1940s ·
1950s ·
1960s ·
1970s ·
1980s ·
1990s

21st century

See also 

 
History of Monaco
Monaco-related lists
Monaco